The enzyme 3-hydroxy-2-methylpyridine-4,5-dicarboxylate 4-decarboxylase catalyzes the chemical reaction

3-hydroxy-2-methylpyridine-4,5-dicarboxylate  3-hydroxy-2-methylpyridine-5-carboxylate + CO2

This enzyme belongs to the family of lyases, specifically the carboxy-lyases, which cleave carbon-carbon bonds.  The systematic name of this enzyme class is 3-hydroxy-2-methylpyridine-4,5-dicarboxylate 4-carboxy-lyase (3-hydroxy-2-methylpyridine-5-carboxylate-forming). This enzyme is also called 3-hydroxy-2-methylpyridine-4,5-dicarboxylate 4-carboxy-lyase. This enzyme participates in vitamin B6 metabolism.

References

 

EC 4.1.1
Enzymes of unknown structure